Osiny  is a village in the administrative district of Gmina Baranów, within Grodzisk Mazowiecki County, Masovian Voivodeship, in east-central Poland. The New Central Polish Airport is planned to be built nearby.

References

Osiny